is the first and only "Best-of" album released by Japanese idol group BiS. The album contains tracks spanning the group's career, and all tracks that were originally released under an earlier lineup have been re-recorded by the 2014 lineup. The instrumental parts for most of the songs have also been re-recorded. The album contains one completely new song (Tada Naite), which is also the last song released by BiS before their initial disbandment. This album is the last CD release by the group before their disbandment.

Releases
Three basic types of this album were released; A standard version with 1 CD and a random photo; A deluxe version with 2 CDs, a DVD and a random photo; a box set with 2 CDs, 3 DVDs, a photobook, a photograph set, a special sticker set and a random boob mousepad of one of the six members. In addition, limited editions of the standard and deluxe editions featured the same content but with different covers.

A vinyl version was released on January 22, 2015.

Track listing

Other items
All items come only with the box Set
BiS's Attempt at an idol photo book 
Special Boob Mousepad
Random boob mousepad of one of the six members
Special Sticker
Mini-Photograph set
BOX set gets all 7 types as a set. Other versions get one random photo.

Personnel

BiS - Lyrics on Tracks 2, 6, 7, 9, 10, 11, 12, 13, 14, 15 and 16
Pour Lui - Vocals; Lyrics on Track 1
Nozomi hirano - Vocals 
First Summer Uika - Vocals (Except Disc 2 Tracks 1, 2, 3, 4, 5 and 6)
Ten Tenko - Vocals (Except Disc 2 Tracks 1, 2, 3, 4, 5 and 6)
Saki Kamiya - Vocals (Except Disc 2 Tracks 1, 2, 3, 4, 5 and 6)
Megumi Koshouji - Vocals (Disc 1 and Disc 2 Track 8)
Ex.BiS
Yukiko Nakayama - Vocals on Disc 2 Tracks 1 and 2
Rina Yokoyama - Vocals on Disc 2 Track 1
Yufu Terashima - Vocals on Disc 2 Tracks 2, 3, 4, 5 and 6
Rio Michibayashi - Vocals on Disc 2 Tracks 3, 4, 5, 6, 7 and 9
Yurika Wakisaka - Vocals on Disc 2 Tracks 3, 4, 5 and 6
Kenta Matsukuma - Sound Producer (Except Track 13); Guitar on Tracks 1, 2, 6, 7, 8, 9, 10, 11, 12, 14, 15 and 16; Programming on Tracks 9, 10 and 11
Takeshi Ueda - Sound Producer and Guitar for Track 13
Takeshi Otani - Guitar on Tracks 1, 12 and 15
Tomoki Tokitou - Guitar on Track 2
Takafumi Sakuma - Guitar on Track 3
Satoshi Aoki - Guitar on Track 4
Ichiro Iguchi - Guitar on Track 5; Programming on Tracks 5, 15 and 16
Hisashi - Lead Guitar on Track 14
Koji Ikuma - Guitar on Track 16
Keita Kitajima - Bass guitar on Tracks 1 and 9 
Taizo Nakamura - Bass guitar on Tracks 2, 7, 11, 12, 14 and 15
Takumi Asada - Bass guitar on Track 3
Takenori Sakauchi - Bass guitar on Tracks 5 and 10
Makoto Shirasaka - Bass guitar on Track 6
Haruki - Bass guitar on Track 8
Ohara Just Begun - Bass guitar on Track 16
Takuya Kusunose - Drums on Tracks 1, 2, 5, 6, 7, 12 and 15
Shouya Kamibayashi - Drums on Track 3
Takashi Todoroki - Drums on Tracks 9, 10 and 11
Toshiyuki Wakayama - Drums on Track 14
Naoya Ito - Drums on Track 16
Minoru Haeta - Piano on Track 3
mifuu - Piano on Tracks 11, 12 and 15
Keiji Yamaguchi - Piano on Track 14
Ann Suhara - Violin on Tracks 3, 7 and 14
Nobuhiro Nakagawa - Sax on Track 3
Shun Yonehara - Trumpet on Track 3
KKHRAI - Chorus on Track 3
UKO - Chorus on Track 3
Tifan - Chorus on Track 15
Katsuto Matsuura - Executive Producer
Mitsuru Yamaguchi - Executive Producer

Notes 
All writing, arrangement and personnel credits taken from the album insert.

References

2014 greatest hits albums
Bis (Japanese idol group) albums